The 2012–13 Football League Cup (known as the Capital One Cup for sponsorship reasons) was the 53rd season of the Football League Cup, a knock-out competition for the top 92 football clubs played in English football league system. Liverpool were the defending champions, having beaten Cardiff City in the 2012 final. They were knocked out in the fourth round by Swansea City.

The final was won by Swansea by 5–0 against Bradford City at Wembley Stadium on 24 February 2013. Bradford were the first team from the fourth tier of English football to appear in a League Cup final since 1962. Swansea was the first Welsh club to win the League Cup and the first Welsh club to win an English club competition since Cardiff City's 1926–27 FA Cup triumph. Swansea qualified for the third qualifying round of the 2013–14 UEFA Europa League through England's berth by winning the cup.

First round
The draw for the first round took place on 14 June 2012 at 09:30 BST. The 35 matches were to be played on 13–15 August 2012, although if both teams agreed, they could play it on 11 or 12 August instead.

Northern section

Southern section

Second round
The draw for the second round took place on 15 August 2012, after all the matches for the first round had been completed. The second round draw included the 35 winners from the first round plus the Premier League clubs that are not competing in European competitions: the UEFA Champions League and UEFA Europa League. The second round draw also included the top two highest ranked teams from last season not currently in the Premier League, these being Blackburn Rovers and Bolton Wanderers.

The 25 ties took place on 28–30 August 2012.

Third round
The draw for the third round was made on 30 August 2012, following the televised second round match between Northampton Town and Wolverhampton Wanderers. The seven English teams playing in European competitions during the season – Arsenal, Chelsea, Liverpool, Manchester City, Manchester United, Newcastle United and Tottenham Hotspur – entered at this stage, while the other 25 teams had all progressed from the second round.

The 16 ties took place on 25–26 September 2012.

Fourth round
The draw for the fourth round was made on 26 September 2012, following the televised Third Round match between Manchester United and Newcastle United. All teams participating in the Fourth Round progressed from the third round.

The ties took place on 30–31 October 2012.

Fifth round
The draw for the fifth round took place on 31 October 2012 after the televised game between Chelsea and Manchester United. Bradford City are the lowest ranked team, as the only team from League Two.

Three of the ties were played on 11 and 12 December 2012. Due to their involvement at the FIFA Club World Cup, Chelsea played their match the following week.

Semi-finals
The draw for the semi-finals took place on 19 December 2012 after the televised game between Leeds United and Chelsea. Bradford City happened to be the only team from outside the Premiership as they were playing in the lowest tier of English League football, the Football League Two, at the time.

First leg

Second leg

Final

Statistics

Top goalscorers

Top assists

Broadcasting rights
The domestic broadcasting rights for the competition were held by the subscription channel Sky Sports, who have held rights to the competition since 1996–97. During this season, Sky had exclusive live broadcasting rights, as the BBC lost the shared live rights it had in the previous season. The BBC could, however, show highlights of matches from each round.

These matches were broadcast live by Sky Sports on television:

References

EFL Cup seasons
Football League Cup
Lea
Cup